Our Happy Lives is a 1999 French drama film directed by Jacques Maillot. It was entered into the 1999 Cannes Film Festival.

Cast
 Marie Payen - Julie
 Cécile Richard - Cécile
 Camille Japy - Emilie
 Sami Bouajila - Ali
 Eric Bonicatto - Jean-Paul
 Jean-Michel Portal - Lucas
 Sarah Grappin - Sylvie
 Olivier Py - François
 Alain Beigel - Antoine
 Fanny Cottençon - Cécile's mother
 Marc Chapiteau - Sylvie's father
 Frédéric Gélard - Vincent
 Jean-Paul Bonnaire - Lucas's father
 Jalil Lespert - Etienne
 Thomas Chabrol - Lawyer Carteret
 Samir Guesmi - Rachid
 Stéphane Brizé - Marco

References

External links

1999 films
French drama films
1990s French-language films
1999 drama films
Films directed by Jacques Maillot
1990s French films